Rafaella Baquerizo (born 25 March 1998) is an Ecuadorian tennis player.

Playing for Ecuador at the Fed Cup, Baquerizo has a win–loss record of 3–3.

On the juniors tour, Baquerizo has a career high ITF junior combined ranking of 85, achieved on 24 February 2014.

She played tennis at Purdue University, between 2016 and 2018.

ITF junior finals

Singles (3–1)

Doubles (9–7)

National representation

Fed Cup
Baquerizo made her Fed Cup debut for Ecuador in 2014, while the team was competing in the Americas Zone Group I, when she was 15 years and 318 days old.

Fed Cup (3–3)

Singles (1–0)

Doubles (2–3)

References

External links
 
 

1998 births
Living people
Ecuadorian female tennis players
Purdue Boilermakers women's tennis players
Ecuadorian expatriate sportspeople in the United States
Sportspeople from Guayaquil
21st-century Ecuadorian women